Malinin (from малина meaning raspberry) is a Russian masculine surname, its feminine counterpart is Malinina. It may refer to
Aleksandr Malinin (born 1958), Russian singer
Boris Malinin (1889–1949), Russian shipbuilding scientist
Denis Malinin (born 1983), Kazakhstani football player
Evgeniy Malinin (born 1986), Kyrgyzstan football player
Ilia Malinin (born 2004), American figure skater)
Mikhail Malinin (1899–1960), Soviet general.
Mike Malinin (born 1967), is an American musician
Tatiana Malinina (born 1973), Russian figure skater
Yevgeny Malinin (1930–2001), Russian pianist

Russian-language surnames